Maresa was a Spanish manufacturer of pinball machines which was in business between 1960 and 1976. The name stands for MAquinas REcreativas Sociedad Anonima, which can be translated as Anonymous Society of Amusement Machines.

The first two games were the electromechanical pinball machines King Ball and Boxing, and their last was the western-themed Laramie in 1976. Many of the pinball machines of the company from Madrid were copies of Gottlieb games, such as Big Brave, and Crescendo.

List of Maresa Pinball Machines

 2002
 300
 4x4
 Beisbol
 Big Brave
 Big Horse
 Bongor
 Boxing
 Bus Stop
 Can Can
 Carrusel
 Centigrade
 Chamonix
 Crescendo
 Dakota
 Dakota II
 Dardos
 Domino 
 El Dorado
 Fans
 Far Out
 Flush
 Jacks Open
 Jumping Jack
 Kansas
 King Ball
 King Pin
 Kuwait
 Laramie
 Metropolis
 Music-Hall
 Nairobi
 Oxford
 Picnic
 Pim Pam Pum
 Pin
 Pro-Football
 Reggio
 Road Race
 Roller Coaster
 Rompeolas
 Royal Flush
 Skating
 Spin Out
 Sprint
 Surf Champ
 Surfer
 Tahiti
 Target Pool
 Texas
 Tiro's
 Top Card
 Top-Secret
 Wheel
 Ye-Ye Club

See also
 Zaccaria (company), a former Italian company of pinball and arcade machines
 Taito of Brazil, a former Brazilian company of pinball and arcade machines
 Inder (company), a former Spanish company of pinball machines
 Sega, S.A. SONIC, a former Spanish company of pinball and arcade machines

References

External links
Arcade Games & Pinball Machines

Defunct manufacturing companies of Spain
Entertainment companies of Spain
Manufacturing companies based in Madrid
Pinball manufacturers